Brian Burns (born April 23, 1998) is an American football defensive end for the Carolina Panthers of the National Football League (NFL). He played college football at Florida State and was drafted by the Panthers in the first round of the 2019 NFL Draft.

Early years
Burns attended American Heritage School, where he played high school football. Over his junior and senior seasons, he had 135 tackles and 28 sacks combined and helped his team win state titles. Burns played in the 2016 U.S. Army All-American Bowl. He committed to Florida State University to play college football.

College career
As a freshman at Florida State in 2016, Burns played in all 13 games and led all freshman in the country with 8.5 sacks. As a sophomore in 2017, he started all 13 games and had 48 tackles and 4.5 sacks. As a junior in 2018, Burns started all 12 games, recording 52 tackles and 10 sacks. After the season, Burns decided to forgo his senior year and enter the 2019 NFL Draft.

College statistics

Professional career

Burns was drafted by the Carolina Panthers 16th overall in the 2019 NFL Draft.

2019
In Week 5 against the Jacksonville Jaguars, Burns recorded a sack and returned a forced fumble for a touchdown in the 34-27 win.

2020
In Week 3 against the Los Angeles Chargers, Burns recorded his first sack of the season, a strip sack that was recovered by the Panthers, during the 21–16 win.
In Week 7 against the New Orleans Saints, Burns recorded a strip sack that was recovered by the Panthers during the 27–24 loss. In Week 11 against the Detroit Lions, Burns recorded two sacks during a shutout win and was named the NFC Defensive Player of the Week.

2022
The Panthers picked up the fifth-year option on Burns' contract on April 26, 2022. In Week 12 against the Denver Broncos, Burns had two sacks, a forced fumble and one pass deflection, earning him NFC Defensive Player of The Week.

NFL career statistics

Regular season

Personal life
Burns' older brother, Stanley McClover, was drafted by the Carolina Panthers in the seventh round of the 2006 NFL Draft. His nickname is Spidey. It is the same nickname as his favorite Marvel character Spider-Man. He also named his sack celebration after the nickname. On December 27, 2021, Burns was placed on the Panthers COVID-19 reserve list along with three other players.

References

External links
 Sports Reference (college)
Florida State Seminoles bio

Living people
1998 births
Players of American football from Fort Lauderdale, Florida
American football defensive ends
American football linebackers
Florida State Seminoles football players
Carolina Panthers players
National Conference Pro Bowl players
American Heritage School (Florida) alumni
Ed Block Courage Award recipients